Pachyiulus hungaricus is a species of millipede from Julidae family that can be found in Albania, Bulgaria, Greece, Romania, and all states of former Yugoslavia (except for Slovenia).

References

Julida
Animals described in 1910
Millipedes of Europe